Terry Maxwell Ronald is an English author, singer, songwriter, and music producer.

Biography
Born in South London, Ronald was a founder member and lead singer with the pop band Gun Shy, who released one single "Just To Be Your Secret", which was Peter Powell's record of the week on Radio One. In the early 1990s, Ronald released solo album "Roma" on MCA Records, from which four singles were released.

Ronald developed his career as a melody writer and lyricist, usually working with another writer. His musical work includes songwriting, production and vocal arranging for Kylie Minogue, Girls Aloud, Dannii Minogue, Sophie Ellis-Bextor, The Wanted, Westlife, The Saturdays,  Lulu, Sheena Easton, Kim Wilde, Atomic Kitten, Geri Halliwell, Elouise and French pop starlet Lorie. In 2007, he appeared as a guest judge on the Judges' Homes section of The X Factor, alongside Dannii Minogue. He has  worked as a vocal coach on music TV shows including The Voice, The Voice Kids, All Together Now and Let's Sing & Dance For Comic Relief.

Ronald has worked on the creative team of several West End theatre productions, including Rent Remixed, which starred Denise Van Outen, Siobhan Donaghy and Luke Evans, and The Hurly Burly Show. In 2013 Ronald co-wrote the musical one-woman play Some Girl I Used To Know with Denise Van Outen.

In 2010, he wrote his first novel Becoming Nancy, published in April 2011 by Transworld and described by Suzy Feay in The Independent as "a deliciously camp rites of passage novel". The book was shortlisted for the 2012 Polari First Book Prize, and in January 2014 it was announced that Tony Award-winning director and choreographer Jerry Mitchell had bought the rights to the musical stage version of the book, which opened in the U.S in 2019 at the Alliance Theatre in Atlanta.

Personal life
Ronald lives in East Dulwich, South London with his civil partner, Mark.

Discography

Solo albums

Solo singles

References

External links
ASCAP listing 

Year of birth missing (living people)
Living people
Musicians from London
English male singers
English songwriters
English record producers
English LGBT musicians
English LGBT writers
British gay writers
British male songwriters